Henry Ndubueze Okoroji (born April 12, 1984 in Ngor Okpala) is a Nigerian footballer who currently plays for Casertana F.C.

Career 
After the 1994 World Cup a series of Nigerian players were brought to the European top leagues. Okoroji's mentor Prince Ikpe Ekong was one of them as he was signed by Italian club A.C. Reggiana back then coached by Carlo Ancelotti. Ikpe Ekong recommended his club to get their hands on a very talented defender Henry Okoroji. He arrived in 2003 as Prince was already on his way out after battling against the whole Serie A in the court and won.

Fiorentina and Serie A 
Henry has played most of his career in the third and fourth level of Italian football. Due to strict non-EU player rules African players have had it hard in Italy. In 2007 however, Henry's skills were noticed by ACF Fiorentina who signed the player on a 1-year contract.

Henry was loaned to Bulgaria, but shortly after his arrival was recalled back to Italy. Therefore, he didn't play any games that season on first level. Later on he was loaned to Chieti Calcio before he went back to FC Pro Vasto.

References 

Living people
1984 births
Nigerian footballers
ACF Fiorentina players
Expatriate footballers in Bulgaria
Nigerian expatriate footballers
A.C. Reggiana 1919 players
Vastese Calcio 1902 players
Expatriate footballers in Italy
PFC Lokomotiv Plovdiv players
Association football defenders
S.S. Chieti Calcio players
Nigerian expatriate sportspeople in Italy
Serie B players
Nigerian expatriate sportspeople in Bulgaria
Casertana F.C. players